Peter Wallace (born 23 October 1946) is a New Zealand cricketer. He played in five first-class matches for Canterbury in 1973/74.

See also
 List of Canterbury representative cricketers

References

External links
 

1946 births
Living people
New Zealand cricketers
Canterbury cricketers
Cricketers from Christchurch